Legend of YungChing is a television series made by Fee Tang Production Co. Ltd and first aired in 1997. It was created by Zhou Lingkang and written by Ting Shan-hsi. The series covers the years between 1718 and 1755, during the reigns of the Kangxi Emperor, Yongzheng Emperor, and Qianlong Emperor of the Qing Dynasty. The show blends elements of historical drama and wuxia drama.

Overview
The assassination of Kangxi during the magnificent "Hunting Exercise of Autumn" sparks off a bloody struggle for the throne. Kangxi orders his fourth son, Prince Yong (Yinzhen), to investigate. Yinzhen disguises himself as a trader in Jiangnan. He meets a famous scholar's daughter named Lu Sisi and, after overcoming various obstacles together, they fall in love. The show shows how Yinzhen's scheming and plotting allowed him to finally become the Yongzheng Emperor.

Cast

1997 Taiwanese television series debuts
Television series set in the Qing dynasty
1990s Taiwanese television series